Manzanillo Port is located in Manzanillo, Monte Cristi Province, Dominican Republic. It is very close to the border with Haiti.

Overview

Port of Manzanillo was built in the 1950s by the Dominican Fruit Company (La Grenada), a North American company dedicated to export bananas and other minor fruits of the country.

This harbor currently is under a leasing-trade for its reconstruction and still been supervised by the Dominican Port Authority.

Its operations are based on deplaning clinker, material for concrete,  exportation of domestic products such as animals, fruits and food to Europe and sometimes general cargo and container cargo operations.

Port information 
 Location: 
 Local time: UTC−4
 Weather/climate/prevailing winds:  From May 15 until September 15
 Climate: mostly sunny, tropical. Hurricane  season runs from June to November
 Prevailing winds: direction ENE–ESE
 Average temperature range: 28–30 °C.

See also 
 List of ports and harbours of the Atlantic Ocean

References 
 Manzanillo Port (Spanish)

Ports and harbours of the Dominican Republic
Urban planning in the Dominican Republic
Buildings and structures in Monte Cristi Province